Natalio Bacalso Avenue, also known as Cebu South Road, is a highway from Cebu to Santander, Cebu. This road is named after Natalio Bacalso, a Cebuano writer.

Route description

Cebu City 
The road starts in Cebu City in a roundabout with Cebu North Road/Osmeña Boulevard/General Maxilom Avenue.

Cebu City to Santander

References 

Roads in Cebu